Giovanni Vittorio Maiello (fl. 17th century?) was an Italian composer. He was maestro di capella at Santa Maria delle Grazie a Capodimonte, Naples.

Works
Liber primus mottectorum tribus vocibus

References

17th-century Italian composers
Italian Baroque composers
Italian male classical composers
17th-century male musicians